Harvey Livett (born 4 January 1997) is a professional rugby league footballer who plays as a  forward or  for the Huddersfield Giants in the Betfred Super League, and the England Knights at international level. 

He played for the Warrington Wolves in the Super League, and spent time on loan from Warrington at the Rochdale Hornets in the Championship and Hull Kingston Rovers in the Super League.

Background
He is the son of the rugby league  who played in the 1990s and 2000s for Workington Town, and Woolston Rovers ARLFC; Peter Livett.

Career

Warrington Wolves
In 2017, he made his Super League début for the Warrington club against the Catalans Dragons, having previously played in pre-season friendlies.

Livett made a short appearance during the 2017 World Club Series match against the Brisbane Broncos in which Warrington were victors 27–18. He then became an important part of the Warrington team during 2017, scoring two tries and converting 10 goals.  In one match, he scored a try and kicked six goals in a 40–18 victory against St Helens. Livett played in the 2018 Challenge Cup Final defeat to the Catalans Dragons at Wembley Stadium.
On 17 June 2019, Livett joined fellow Super League side Hull Kingston Rovers on a months loan.

Salford
On 11 December 2020 it was announced that Livett would join Salford on a two-year deal for the 2021 season.

Huddersfield Giants
On 12 October 2022 it was announced that Livett would join Huddersfield Giants on a 3-year deal for the 2023 season.

International career
In July 2018 he was selected in the England Knights Performance squad. Later that year he was selected for the England Knights on their tour of Papua New Guinea. He played against Papua New Guinea at the Oil Search National Football Stadium.

References

External links
Warrington Wolves profile
SL profile
Warrington Wolves youngster Harvey Livett has been ruled out of the rest of the 2017 season

1997 births
Living people
England Knights national rugby league team players
Huddersfield Giants players
Hull Kingston Rovers players
Rochdale Hornets players
Rugby league centres
Rugby league halfbacks
Rugby league players from Warrington
Rugby league second-rows
Salford Red Devils players
Warrington Wolves players